The Netherlands were present at the Eurovision Song Contest 1986, held in Bergen, Norway, after opting out of the previous year's contest in Gothenburg, Sweden.

Before Eurovision

Nationaal Songfestival 1986 
The Dutch national final to select their entry was held on 1 April 1986 at the Theater De Flint in Amersfoort, and was hosted by the pianist and television host Pim Jacobs. Twelve regional juries across the Netherlands selected the winning song.

The winning entry was "Alles heeft een ritme", performed by the teenage girl group Frizzle Sizzle. The song was composed by Peter Schön and Rob ten Bokum, and the lyrics were written by Schön.

At Eurovision
Frizzle Sizzle performed seventh on the night of the contest, following Iceland and preceding Turkey. By the time the song got to Bergen, it was simply credited as "Alles heeft ritme".

At the close of the voting the song had received 40 points, placing 13th in a field of 20 competing countries. This placing was identical to the previous time the Netherlands had competed in Eurovision, in 1984.

The Dutch conductor at the contest was Harry van Hoof.

Voting

References

External links
Dutch National Final 1986

1986
Countries in the Eurovision Song Contest 1986
Eurovision